Little Girl Blue may refer to:

 "Little Girl Blue" (song), a 1935 song by Richard Rodgers and Lorenz Hart
 Little Girl Blue (album), an album by Nina Simone
 Little Girl Blue (2007 film), a Czech film directed by Alice Nellis
 Janis: Little Girl Blue, a 2015 documentary film
 Little Girl Blue (upcoming film), an upcoming docudrama film directed by Mona Achache
 Nickname given by the media to Helen Bailey, an eight-year-old schoolgirl who was killed in 1975

See also
Little Girl Blue/Little Girl New,  a 1963 album by Keely Smith